Israel competed at the 2019 European Games in Minsk, Belarus from 21 June to 30 June 2019.

Medalists

Competitors
The Israeli delegation include 32 athletes competing in 10 sports.

Archery

Recurve

Badminton

Boxing

Men

Cycling

Road

Men

Women

Gymnastics

Acrobatic

Women's groups

Artistic
Men
Apparatus

Women
All-Around

Apparatus

Rhythmic

Individual

Apparatus

Judo

Men

Women

Shooting

Men

Women

Mixed

Wrestling

Men's freestyle

References

Nations at the 2019 European Games
European Games
2019